Yevhen Odyntsov (born 23 August 1986) is a Ukrainian football midfielder who plays for TSK Simferopol.

Odyntsov is a product of the UOR Simferopol youth sportive school and spent time playing for different Ukrainian teams. In July 2013 he signed a contract with FC Olimpik Donetsk.

References

External links
Profile at Official Site FFU (Ukr)

1986 births
Living people
People from Yevpatoria
Ukrainian footballers
Ukrainian footballers banned from domestic competitions
Association football midfielders
Ukrainian Premier League players
SC Tavriya Simferopol players
FC Khimik Krasnoperekopsk players
FC Dnipro Cherkasy players
FC Naftovyk-Ukrnafta Okhtyrka players
FC Stal Alchevsk players
FC Poltava players
FC Olimpik Donetsk players
FC TSK Simferopol players
Crimean Premier League players